"Big Man on Mulberry Street" is a song by Billy Joel from the 1986 album The Bridge.

The jazz-influenced song's title refers to Mulberry Street in the Little Italy section of New York City.

Jazz musician Ron Carter plays acoustic bass on the track. The horn section includes acclaimed musicians Eddie Daniels on alto saxophone, Michael Brecker on tenor saxophone, Ronnie Cuber on baritone saxophone, Marvin Stamm and Alan Rubin (a.k.a. Mr Fabulous) on trumpets and Dave Bargeron (of Blood, Sweat & Tears) on trombone.

Television version
An extended version of the song, with an added horn solo, was used in the November 18, 1986, episode of the ABC series Moonlighting that was also titled "Big Man on Mulberry Street." In a dream sequence choreographed by Stanley Donen that doubles as a dialogue-free dance number, Maddie Hayes (Cybill Shepherd) envisions the romantic history of her business partner, David Addison (Bruce Willis), and his ex-wife (Sandahl Bergman).

An extended version is also played during Joel's 1987 concert in Leningrad, and during the outro, Billy introduces the band. This can be heard on the live album KOHUEPT.

References

Billy Joel songs
Songs written by Billy Joel
Song recordings produced by Phil Ramone
Columbia Records singles
1986 songs
Songs about New York City
Songs about streets